The swimming competition at the 1959 Mediterranean Games was held in Beirut, Lebanon.

Medallists

Men's events

Medal table

References
Complete 1959 Mediterranean Games report released by the International Mediterranean Games Committee

Mediterranean Games
Sports at the 1959 Mediterranean Games
1959